Ali minaret is a historical minaret in Isfahan, Iran. It is close to the Ali mosque. This minaret is the oldest minaret in Isfahan, which dates back to the 11th century. It is said that this minaret was originally , but its height has been decreased  in the course of time. There are four inscriptions on the Ali minaret. One of the inscriptions is made of brick and the others are made of ceramic.

See also
List of the historical structures in the Isfahan province

References 

Towers completed in the 11th century
Minarets in Iran
Buildings and structures in Isfahan